Orangaslia is a genus of soft corals in the family Xeniidae. It is monotypic with a single species, Orangaslia dipperae.

References

Xeniidae
Octocorallia genera